The 2021 British Grand Prix (officially known as the Formula 1 Pirelli British Grand Prix 2021 for sponsorship reasons) was a Formula One motor race held on 18 July 2021 at the Silverstone Circuit in Northamptonshire, England.

It was the tenth round of the 2021 Formula One World Championship and also featured the first ever "sprint qualifying" event in F1 - a new format run on the Saturday of the race weekend over a distance of around 1/3rd the usual race distance. 3 points were awarded to the winner of the Sprint, 2 to 2nd place and 1 to 3rd place.

The sprint qualification was won by Max Verstappen giving him pole position for the race while the race was won by Lewis Hamilton who won his record eighth British Grand Prix.

Background 

The event, which was held over the weekend of  July, was the only Formula One race at Silverstone in 2021, after the venue had held two races behind closed doors due to the COVID-19 pandemic in the United Kingdom during 2020; the 2020 British Grand Prix was won by Lewis Hamilton, while the other one-off race, the 70th Anniversary Grand Prix, was won by Max Verstappen. This was the seventy-second time the British Grand Prix had formed a part of the world championship. In February 2021, the organisers at Silverstone Circuit said they hoped the race would have a capacity 140,000 crowd, but that this was dependent on the impact of the COVID-19 pandemic in the United Kingdom, which had forced the two races held at Silverstone in 2020 to be behind closed doors. Hamilton aimed to win the event for a record-breaking eighth time, having won the event seven times overall previously having first won the event in 2008 and  going for his third consecutive British GP win having won the event the previous two seasons. The United Kingdom government allowed fans to return to live major sporting events on 17 May 2021 in limited numbers.

On 14 June 2021, the United Kingdom's government announced that a planned further easing of lockdown restrictions in England would be delayed from an original date of 21 June 2021 to 19 July 2021, a delay of four weeks and the day after the Silverstone race took place. This meant Silverstone would require special exemption to gain a capacity crowd and the circuit began work with the Department for Digital, Culture, Media and Sport to try and establish how many fans the venue would be allowed to host. On 24 June 2021, the British Grand Prix was given permission to take place with a full capacity crowd as a part of United Kingdom government's events research programme with ticket holders either required to provide evidence of negative lateral flow test carried out 48 hours before their attendance of the event or proof of double vaccination against the virus fourteen days before attending the first day of the event. Upon being asked for his reaction to news about Silverstone being permitted to have a capacity crowd, Hamilton said in a press conference prior to the Styrian Grand Prix that he feared allowing such big numbers of spectators to attend the event were "premature" but some of his fellow drivers, notably George Russell and Verstappen, were more positive about the news. Reportedly more of the spectators were women than in previous years.

On Thursday 15 July, one day prior to start of the weekend action, Lando Norris admitted in an interview to Craig Slater of Sky Sports his preparations for his home race were not ideal, stating he was "sore", "not in the perfect condition", and he was "struggling to get sleep" after he was mugged in an incident at Wembley Stadium after the UEFA Euro 2020 Final. Also on 15 July, McLaren made a statement confirming that three of their team had tested positive for COVID-19. Notably, chief executive officer Zak Brown was one of the three who were positive. Neither of the drivers had to self-isolate and the plans for the weekend were "unaffected." The event marked the seventieth anniversary of Scuderia Ferrari's first world championship Grand Prix win. A full-scale mock-up model illustrating what cars built to the planned 2022 aerodynamic regulations will look like was revealed at the venue on the Thursday before the Grand Prix.

Following the Austrian Grand Prix, Verstappen led the Drivers' Championship from Hamilton by 32 points, who leads third placed Sergio Pérez by 46 points. Red Bull Racing led Mercedes by 44 points in the Constructors' Championship. The drivers and teams were the same as the season entry list, with no additional stand-in drivers for the race. Sole tyre supplier Pirelli allocated the C1, C2, and C3 compounds of tyre to be used in the race. The weekend saw the race debut of new rear-tyre construction following a successful test in practice at the previous event in Austria. The new construction is designed to improve safety, by preventing rear-tyre failures, such as those experienced by Lance Stroll and Verstappen at the Azerbaijan Grand Prix earlier in the season.

Weekend format  

The 2021 British Grand Prix was the first race in the season to implement the new sprint-qualifying format, with two others expected to do the same later in the season. It was agreed after the FIA, Formula One and all ten teams had reached a unanimous agreement, regarding the schedule of the weekend. This saw a change in the weekend format as well as the rules. Usually, Friday would host two practice sessions, one in the morning and the other in the afternoon. Saturday would have the final practice in the morning with qualifying in the afternoon. Sunday would have just one session, the  race. The sprint qualifying changes this format, and on a Friday there would be one practice session in the early afternoon and a traditional qualifying (to determine the sprint-qualifying starting order) in the evening. On a Saturday, the second practice would take place at noon, with a newly added sprint race happening in the afternoon. Sunday is unchanged in this format. This also meant that this was the first F1 weekend for many years with a Friday qualification season.

Formula One's director of data systems Rob Smedley said the sport would do the best it could to make sure that sprint-qualifying races do not become a "blur" for fans. Whilst ex-World Champion Sebastian Vettel has voiced his scepticism over the sprint-qualifying idea, drivers such as Hamilton, Carlos Sainz Jr., Fernando Alonso, and Russell have reacted positively with Formula One willingness to try a new format. Ferrari driver Charles Leclerc suggested the sprint-qualifying experiments should not continue in the future if they were proven to be unsuccessful. Leclerc also said he believed that sprint qualifying would enable drivers to push "for a whole race". Changes to sporting regulations to accommodate sprint qualifying were approved by teams prior to the Austrian Grand Prix ready for approval from the FIA. Hamilton later revised his opinion, and he thought the new format probably "would not be too exciting" and saw it being "a train". Formula One managing director Ross Brawn said that the sprint-qualifying experiment could be the first of many Formula One format experiments. The weekend was the first time since the 1959 German Grand Prix at AVUS (where results of the Grand Prix itself were decided on aggregate with drivers completing two 30-lap heats) that a Grand Prix meeting had consisted of more than one race for Grand Prix cars during a weekend.

Sprint qualifying 
The grid order for sprint qualifying would be decided via the normal Q1, Q2, Q3 qualifying session. The final classification of the sprint qualifying race would be the starting grid for the race. The winner of the sprint qualifying would be on pole. Additionally, sprint qualifying awards points to the top three finishers. The maximum time limit would be 60 minutes, and normal fuel flow limits would still apply. The top three in sprint qualifying would also be given a victory parade and special wreaths for their efforts.

Practice 
The first free practice session commenced on Friday at 14:30 BST in warm sunny conditions. Verstappen of Red Bull topped the timing sheets, 0.779 seconds ahead of Norris, who was second for McLaren. Reigning World Champion Hamilton was third for Mercedes, just 0.001 seconds slower than second-placed Norris.

The second free practice session took place on Saturday at 12:00 BST in sunny conditions. Verstappen topped the timing sheets again, 0.375 seconds ahead of Leclerc. Leclerc's teammate Sainz, was in third, 0.230 seconds behind. There were no major incidents in either of the practice sessions.

Qualifying 
Qualifying took place on Friday at 18:00 BST. Hamilton set the fastest time in qualifying, granting him first place for sprint qualifying ahead of Verstappen in second and his teammate Valtteri Bottas in third. As the winner of sprint qualifying would be given the title of polesitter, the driver who set the fastest time was instead named the event's speed king. Formula One's chief technical officer Pat Symonds said that control over how the title of pole position is declared lies with the Fédération Internationale de l'Automobile and not Formula One Management.

Qualifying classification

Sprint qualifying
Sprint qualifying took place on Saturday at 16:30 BST and was contested over seventeen laps. Hamilton lost out at the start with Verstappen overtaking him into first place. Verstappen had had trouble getting his car's tyres up to temperature in the cooler temperatures of qualifying, but it was much warmer for the sprint. Bottas and Leclerc remained in the third and fourth positions they started in for the duration of the sprint. Alonso went from eleventh to fifth in the first lap, while Nikita Mazepin hit his Haas teammate Mick Schumacher, causing Mazepin to spin on track. Also on the first lap, Russell and Sainz made contact, resulting in Sainz dropping down to 19th place; Russell was handed a three-place grid penalty by the FIA. The next major incident was when Pérez lost control of his car on lap 5, spinning off into the gravel. He was able to carry on but later retired on lap 16. Alonso, who finished the sprint in seventh, was given a warning for moving in the braking zone, to which he responded by saying that he intended to continue driving the same way for the rest of the year. Alonso was passed by the two McLaren drivers without much resistance, as they had faster cars than him, but he was then able to hold off Vettel's Aston Martin AMR21. Formula One held the event with the intent to analyse the views of audiences on the format, and noted that there had been both positive and negative reactions.

Sprint qualifying classification

Notes 
  – George Russell received a three-place grid penalty for causing a collision with Carlos Sainz Jr.
  – Sergio Pérez was classified as he completed more than 90% of the sprint qualifying distance. He was due to start the race from the back of the grid for exceeding his quota of power unit elements. This made no difference as he was already due to start from last place. He was then required to start the race from the pit lane for a rear wing and suspension setup change in parc fermé.

Race 
The race started at 15:00 BST (14:00 UTC). Hamilton had a better start than Verstappen, and they ran side by side through the first corner, each contesting for the lead throughout the first half of the lap. A better run out of the fourth turn allowed Hamilton to briefly get ahead going in to the sixth turn, but Verstappen was able to get back past on the inside, with Hamilton then accelerating faster than Verstappen out of the seventh turn. Hamilton collided with Verstappen into Copse corner, with Verstappen's rear-right tyre stripped from the wheel rim. Verstappen slid sideways across the gravel trap on the outside of the track, and collided with the tyre wall at at least .

The crash saw a red flag brought out following Verstappen's retirement, with the race suspended for fifteen minutes while Verstappen's car was removed and the tyre wall repaired. Hamilton received a ten-second time penalty for causing the collision, with stewards ruling that Hamilton was predominantly, but not fully, at fault in the contact. Hamilton's car was repaired during the stoppage. Verstappen was taken to the circuit medical centre, and subsequently hospital, for precautionary checks after the  sideways impact into the barriers. Verstappen was released from hospital later that night as he was not seriously injured.

The collision with Verstappen caused Hamilton to lose speed, allowing Leclerc to get through into the lead before the race was neutralised. Hamilton pitted from second, served his ten-second time penalty and came back out fourth. He quickly dispatched Norris's McLaren and then his teammate, Bottas, who was instructed to let Hamilton past. Norris suffered a slow pit stop following an issue with the rear right tyre, placing him behind Bottas in fourth as he rejoined the race, where he remained for the rest of the race. Norris lost further time after emerging from the pit lane as he had to clear Alonso. This was the fifteenth consecutive race in which Norris finished in the points. Bottas's water bottle broke during the race. Leclerc struggled with intermittent power issues throughout the first half of the race, with momentary losses of power keeping the interval between him an Hamilton at around 1.5 seconds. Hamilton caught up to Leclerc on lap 50, where he overtook him for the lead. Hamilton's move on Leclerc was similar to the one he made on Verstappen, but with less fuel in the tank and warmer tyres Hamilton did not understeer this time around and held the apex. Leclerc had a little moment mid corner that caused him to run wide on the exit, allowing Hamilton to complete the overtake. Leclerc had led for almost the entire race, which was seen as unexpected given the relative pace of the Ferrari SF21 to the Mercedes W12 and the Red Bull RB16B.

Vettel lost control of his Aston Martin during a battle with Alonso on the fourth lap. This saw Vettel drop down to last; he recovered into 17th, but later retired. Kimi Räikkönen, in the Alfa Romeo, also spun, on lap 49, after a minor collision with Red Bull driver Pérez. Pérez pitted on the next lap for new soft tyres, in a bid to take Hamilton's fastest lap away (which is worth a championship point). Scuderia AlphaTauri driver Pierre Gasly had a puncture late in the race, which dropped him out of the points.

Post-race and retrospective 
Much of the post-race debate surrounded the Hamilton–Verstappen incident on the first lap, with the collision compared by some to previous collisions which have occurred during close championship battles, and the likelihood of incidents under such circumstances also being noted. Verstappen said that the penalty issued to Hamilton mid-race was not enough, and felt Hamilton's post-race celebrations were "disrespectful and unsportsmanlike". Mercedes said that they would not have celebrated the win had they not known Verstappen was uninjured. Hamilton said that he did not believe himself to be at fault, adding that "regardless of whether I agree with the penalty, I'll take it on the chin and I just kept working." Hamilton expressed relief that Verstappen was uninjured.

Red Bull team principal Christian Horner called Hamilton's move "desperate" and his victory "hollow". He also said "[w]e are lucky that there wasn't someone seriously hurt. That's what I'm most angry about", and that he could not "see how Lewis can take any satisfaction from the win when you have put your fellow competitor and driver in hospital." Horner said Verstappen was winded in the crash. Red Bull advisor Helmut Marko accused Hamilton of dangerous driving and suggested that the seven-time champion be banned for one race. Mercedes team principal Toto Wolff defended Hamilton, stating that it was merely a racing incident and "it always takes two to tango", and brushed off Marko's criticism of Hamilton. Wolff believed that Hamilton's move complied with the sport's guidelines on when an overtaking driver is entitled to a corner, as Hamilton was further alongside Verstappen than the diagrams provided to competitors illustrated, although said guidelines stipulate that this only applies if the driver "make[s] the corner cleanly." Mercedes trackside engineer Andrew Shovlin stated that the collision was "inevitable", citing Verstappen's aggressive driving style. Red Bull were also concerned about the financial cost of repairing or replacing a crashed racing car. According to Horner, the damage amounted to at least £1,300,000.

Several drivers, including Leclerc and Bottas, believed that it was a racing incident, with Sainz adding that it was "difficult to judge". Leclerc (who was the next car behind Verstappen and Hamilton) noted: "There was space on the inside. Maybe Lewis was not completely at the apex but it is also true Max was quite aggressive on the outside. Things happen." Daniel Ricciardo said that Hamilton "went in too hot" but felt that the collision was unintentional, and that the aerodynamic design of the cars was a major contributing factor. Alonso believed neither Hamilton nor Verstappen had done anything wrong, suggesting Hamilton was at a tricky position.

Formula One sporting director Brawn said that he hoped the incident would not be repeated, adding that "nobody wants the championship decided on crashes and penalties." Indycar Series championship leader Alex Palou said that he would have done the same thing as Hamilton or Verstappen in either of their positions. Race director Michael Masi stood ground with the stewards' decision, stating that the stewards do not take the consequences of an incident into account when deciding penalties.

Hamilton became the target of racial abuse online following the race. Fellow competitors Red Bull and McLaren (with whom Hamilton won his first Drivers' Championship title in 2008), along with Formula One and other members of the Formula One community, also condemned those who were racist against Hamilton. Social media firm Facebook, Inc criticised the abuse and said they had deleted some offensive comments from their platforms.

Several drivers expressed disappointment in their post-race results, with Norris and Sainz in particular stating that their long pit stops endured during the race cost them a better result, the former a potential podium finish. Regarding his own race, Leclerc said that he "gave not 100%, but 200%." Pérez lamented that he would have finished in seventh had he not taken a third stop to take away the fastest lap extra point from Hamilton as well as his late clash with Räikkönen, with Gasly echoing similar thoughts after a third stop for a late puncture denied him a potential points finish. Räikkönen felt that he had spent most of his race trying to prevent faster cars from getting past him. In the build up to the Hungarian Grand Prix on 27 July Red Bull requested the right to review the severity of Hamilton's penalty for the incident with Verstappen but the Stewards dismissed it. Red Bull's motivation for lodging the appeal was questioned in some quarters, with the potential negative public relations outcomes being noted. In a post-season interview Verstappen (who now was a World Champion) said being in hospital after the crash was among the lowest points of his title winning 2021 season. Verstappen told the GP Racing magazine the following year that he no longer had any ill feeling with Hamilton over the accident.

Race classification

Championship standings after the race

Drivers' Championship standings

Constructors' Championship standings

 Note: Only the top five positions are included for both sets of standings.

See also 
 2021 Silverstone FIA Formula 2 round
 2021 W Series Silverstone round

Notes

References

External links 

British
Grand Prix
British Grand Prix
British Grand Prix
Grand Prix